Loxostege caradjana is a moth in the family Crambidae. It was described by Aurelian Popescu-Gorj in 1991. It is found in Sichuan, China.

References

Moths described in 1991
Pyraustinae